Carabus akinini buffi is a black-coloured subspecies of beetle from family Carabidae, endemic to Kyrgyzstan.

References

akinini buffi
Beetles described in 1992
Endemic fauna of Kyrgyzstan